Yuri Sergeyevich Sedov (March 4, 1929 in Moscow – April 4, 1995 in Moscow) was a Soviet football player and manager.

Coaching Honours
 Iceland Premier League winner: 1981, 1982

Player Honours
 Soviet Top League winner: 1952, 1953, 1958.
 Soviet Cup winner: 1950

International career
Sedov made his debut for USSR on September 8, 1954 in a friendly against Sweden.

External links
 Profile on rusteam 
 Profile on FC Spartak Moskva official site 
 Profile on KLISF

1929 births
1995 deaths
Russian footballers
Soviet footballers
Soviet Union international footballers
Soviet football managers
FC Spartak Moscow players
Soviet Top League players
Knattspyrnufélagið Víkingur managers
Russian football managers
Russian expatriate football managers
Association football defenders